Cançons Tradicionals Catalanes (Traditional Catalan songs) is a 1991 album of Catalan music by Victoria de los Ángeles, accompanied by Geoffrey Parsons. Recorded at the Abbey Road Studios, London, it was originally released on Collins Classics in 1992, and later re-released with the original texts and translations by Brilliant Classics.

Track listing
 El cant dels ocells
 Muntanyes regalades
 El mariner
 El mestre
 Mariagneta
 Muntanyes del Canigó
 El rossinyol
 El bon caçador
 La filla del marxant
 L’hereu Riera
 Els estudiantes de Tolosa
 La ploma de perdiu
 Els fadrins de Sant Boi
 Caterina d’Alió
 La Margarideta
 La Mare de Déu
 Josep i Maria
 El noi de la mare
 El desembre congelat
 La dama d’Aragó
 El testament d’Amèlia
 La muller del gavatxot
 La filadora
 La presó de Lleida
 Cançó del lladre
 Els pobres traginers
 La filla del carmesí
 Els tres tambors
 Els segadors

References

External links
Music web review

1991 classical albums
Catalan music